Dad's Dead is a seven-minute award winning film written and directed by Chris Shepherd, commissioned by animate!. It was first transmitted on Channel 4, in 2003. Mixing animation with live action, it deals with how memory works.

On 27 August 2007 Dad's Dead was released as an extra on the DVD release of Danny Boyle's science fiction film Sunshine. A new remastered HD version of the film was released for the first time in January 2015 to coincide with the completion of the 2016 sequel Johnno's Dead.

Synopsis
Ian Hart plays the narrator, an urban storyteller who relives his youth in 1970s and 80s Liverpool.

The narrator opens by asking the viewer if they ever think about the people they went to school with. He goes on to talk about his "best mate", Johnno, a popular and rebellious boy at school. However, Johnno turns out to be a thoroughly obnoxious and violent person, frequently swindling, stealing, vandalizing property and generally committing antisocial acts. He apparently enjoys cruelty to animals, throwing hamsters and cats off high-rise flats and bricking ducks. Johnno once confused the narrator by falsely telling him his father had died (hence the film's title).

The film then shows Johnno (whose face distorts into an ugly caricature every time he commits an unpleasant act) first beating up the narrator, then inviting him to the house of a "mate" — a blind man who thinks Johnno is his best friend, while Johnno in fact vandalizes his house, leaves maggot-infested food in his kitchen and even spits on him, all without the man being aware of it. The climax of the film has Johnno leaving the narrator unconscious as he burns the blind man's apartment — a crime for which the narrator is wrongly imprisoned. At the end, the narrator's elderly mother is shown answering the door to her Meals on Wheels carer - who turns out to be Johnno, laughing nastily as he enters the old woman's home.

Awards

2003
 Winner of Best Short Film, British Independent Film Awards
 Winner of The Quantel Animation Award at  Rushes Soho Shorts Festival
 Winner of The Metropolis Prize at L’Isola Del Cinema Festival in Rome, Italy
 Winner of The Grand Prize at Cabbagetown Film & Video Festival, Toronto
 Winner of The Encouragement Award at Fantoche International Animation Fest. Switzerland
 Winner of Special Video Award at Split International Festival of New Film, Croatia
 Winner of Best Independent Animation Award at FAN International Animation Festival, Norwich
 Winner of Best Animation Award at Kino International Film Festival, Manchester
 Winner of Best Professional Film Award at BAF! International Animation Festival, Bradford
 Winner of Special Prize at DaKino Film Festival, Romania
 Winner of Third Prize at Animadrid, IV International Animation Festival, Spain

2004
 Nominated for Best Animation Short, BAFTA Film Awards
 Winner of Best Short Film at the British Animation Awards
 Winner of Best film at Cutting Edge, British Animation Awards
 Winner of Honourable Mention (Editing) at Carolina Film and Video Festival, USA
 Winner of Best Film, Pitcher and Piano Awards, London
 Winner of Honourable Mention at Ann Arbor Film Festival, USA
 Winner of Honourable Mention at Bermuda International Film Festival, USA
 Winner of Silver Remi Award at Worldfest Houston International Film Festival, USA
 Honourable Mention at Los Angeles International Film Festival, USA

An animate! commission funded by Arts Council England and Channel 4.

DVD releases
Shorts! Volume 1 December 2003. USA. Region 1. ASIN:B00013UGE6. As part of compilation with The Making Of Dad's Dead and director's commentary.
onedotzero_selectdvd2  January 2004. UK. All regions. ASIN:B000189K80. As part of a compilation with The Making Of Dad's Dead.
Animatic Volume 1 2004. France. Reperages Magagzine. All regions. As part of a compilation.
Sunshine August 2007. UK. Region 2. ASIN:B000S6UZEM. As extra.
Sunshine October 2007. UK. Region 2. Blu-ray. ASIN:B000VIRD6U. As extra.
Sunshine January 2008. USA. Region 1. ASIN:B000Y7U98C. As extra.
Sunshine January 2008. USA. Region 1. Blu-ray. ASIN:B000Y7U98W. As extra.
Motion Blur 2 January 2008. UK. All regions. . Interview and feature on director with film on DVD.
Chris Shepherd - Beyond Animation 2014. France. All regions. As part of compilation.

Sources
http://www.dadsdead.com
http://www.chrisshepherdfilms.com
animate!: Dad's Dead

https://web.archive.org/web/20060724033236/http://www.sundancechannel.com/film/?ixFilmID=6873
http://www.bbc.co.uk/dna/filmnetwork/A8659407
http://www.realmovienews.com/dvd/news/1231

2003 animated films
2003 films
2003 short films
2000s animated short films
2003 drama films
British animated short films
2000s English-language films
2000s British films